Jeff Bonforte is the CEO of Grindr. He was a senior vice president  of Communications Products at Yahoo!, responsible for  Yahoo! Mail, Yahoo! Messenger, Yahoo! Answers, Yahoo! Groups, Yahoo! Contacts and Yahoo! Calendar.  Before that he was Chief executive officer (CEO) of  Xobni, a company that Yahoo! bought in July 2013.

In late 2013, in regard to a multi-week Yahoo Mail outage and massive user dissatisfaction with the site re-design, Bonforte said at a weekly employee meeting that Yahoo would have to "kick users hard" in the nuts before they would leave Yahoo Mail.

Bonforte became the CEO of Grindr in June 2020.

References

External links
 Jeff Bonforte's personal website (archived)

20th-century births
Year of birth missing (living people)
Living people
American technology chief executives
Yahoo! employees